John Knight (born 1945 in Hollywood, California) is a conceptual artist in Los Angeles, California who works in situ. Since the 1960s, Knight has made pioneering works grounded in site-specificity and institutional critique, works that interrogate underlying economic systems.

Exhibitions

Solo
 John Knight – Enkele Werken, formerly known as Witte de With Center for Contemporary Art, Rotterdam (1990).
 Espai d’art contemporani de Castelló, Castellón (2008).
 John Knight, Autotypes, A Work in Situ, Greene Naftali (2011)
 Portikus, Frankfurt (2013)
 Cabinet Gallery at Fitzpatrick-Leland House, Los Angeles (2014)
 Art Institute of Chicago (2015)
 John Knight, A Work in Situ, Ground Floor, Greene Naftali (2015)
 John Knight, A work in situ, Redcat, Los Angeles (2016)
 John Knight, Vacant Possession, Cabinet, London (2016)

Group
 Whitney Biennial, Whitney Museum, New York (2012)

Publications
 John Knight, Cold Cuts, Espai d’art contemporani de Castelló, Castellón (2009)
 John Knight, Autotypes, Greene Naftali (2011)
 John Knight, Quiet Quality, Cabinet Gallery (2013)
 John Knight (October Files), MIT Press, Cambridge (2014)

References

External links
 Greene Naftali

1945 births
Living people
American conceptual artists
Artists from Los Angeles